Live at the BBC is a live album by British rock band Dire Straits, released on 26 June 1995 on Vertigo Records internationally, and by Warner Bros. Records in the United States. The album was recorded on 22 July 1978 at BBC Studios in London, with one track recorded on 31 January 1981. The studio versions of the first six songs were released on Dire Straits. Live at the BBC was the band's third live album, preceded by Alchemy: Dire Straits Live (1984) and On the Night (1993).

Release
Live at the BBC was released on 26 June 1995, the year in which the group officially disbanded. According to Knopfler, the album was released because Dire Straits still owed one album to Phonogram Records (now Mercury Records). This album was a means to end the legal contract, before Mark Knopfler began his solo career (still signed to Mercury).

Composition
Live at the BBC consists of eight songs, the first seven were recorded for the BBC Live in Concert series on 22 July 1978. The eighth song, "Tunnel of Love", was recorded for the BBC TV program The Old Grey Whistle Test on 31 January 1981, as stated in the booklet, but this version really comes from Westfalenhalle, Dortmund, Germany, recorded on 19 December 1980.

The album features one unreleased song, "What's the Matter Baby?", co-written by Mark Knopfler and his brother David. It is the only song to appear on a Dire Straits album not written exclusively by Mark Knopfler; while two other Dire Straits songs list Knopfler sharing writing credits — "Tunnel of Love" from Making Movies (with Richard Rodgers and Oscar Hammerstein II) and "Money for Nothing" from Brothers in Arms (with Sting) — but in both cases the song itself was entirely written by Knopfler, with only a small contribution to the backing or arrangement by the other credited artist. The riffs and general structure of "What's the Matter Baby?" were largely recycled for the song "Lady Writer" from the band's second album Communiqué, which may explain why it was never re-recorded in the studio.

Critical reception

In his review for AllMusic, William Ruhlmann gave the album three and a half out of five stars, writing, "It's a modest effort from a modest band and, in that sense, a better representation of them than Alchemy or on the Night, both of which reflected their worldwide popularity." The album stayed on the UK albums chart for one week.

Track listing
All songs were written by Mark Knopfler, except where indicated.

Personnel
Dire Straits
Mark Knopfler – guitar, vocals
David Knopfler – guitar, backing vocals (except on track 8)
John Illsley – bass, backing vocals
Pick Withers – drums
Alan Clark – keyboards (only on track 8)
Hal Lindes – guitar (only on track 8)

Charts

Certifications and sales

References

1995 live albums
BBC Radio recordings
Dire Straits live albums
Vertigo Records live albums
Warner Records live albums